Melodifestivalen 2021 was the 61st edition of the Swedish music competition Melodifestivalen. The competition was organised by Sveriges Television (SVT) and took place over a six-week period between 6 February and 13 March 2021. Due to the impacts of the COVID-19 pandemic, all shows of this edition took place in the Annexet in Stockholm, and without an audience. The winner of the competition was Tusse with the song "Voices", who represented Sweden in the Eurovision Song Contest 2021 in Rotterdam, Netherlands, where he came fourteenth with 109 points.

The format of the competition consisted of 6 shows: 4 heat rounds, a second chance round and a final. An initial 28 entries were selected for the competition through three methods: an open call for song submissions, direct invitations to specific artists and songwriters, and a wildcard given to one of the artists that participated in the P4 Nästa competition organised by Sveriges Radio P4. The 28 competing entries were divided into four heats, with seven compositions in each. From each heat, the songs that earned first and second place qualified directly to the final, while the songs that placed third and fourth proceeded to the Second Chance round. The bottom three songs in each heat were eliminated from the competition. An additional four entries qualified from the Second Chance round to the final, bringing the total number of competing entries in the final to 12.

All six shows were hosted by Christer Björkman, who was joined by guest co-hosts during each show: Lena Philipsson (heat 1), Oscar Zia and Anis Don Demina (heat 2), Jason Diakité (heat 3), Per Andersson and Pernilla Wahlgren (heat 4), Shirley Clamp (Second Chance round), and Shima Niavarani and Måns Zelmerlöw (final).

Format
Due to pandemic precautions, SVT did not hold the usual Melodifestivalen tour around six different Swedish cities. The shows did not have a live audience.

Presenters 
On 4 January 2021, the presenters of the 61st edition of Melodifestivalen were announced. Christer Björkman, contest producer of Melodifestivalen for the past 20 years and outgoing head of the Swedish delegation at the Eurovision Song Contest, served as the main presenter for all six shows. Björkman was joined by guest co-hosts during each show: Lena Philipsson (heat 1), Oscar Zia and Anis Don Demina (heat 2), Jason Diakité (heat 3), Per Andersson and Pernilla Wahlgren (heat 4), Shirley Clamp (Second Chance round), Shima Niavarani and Måns Zelmerlöw (final).

Competing entries
Broadcaster SVT revealed on 27 November 2020 that they would be releasing the acts for Melodifestivalen 2021 on a countdown, starting on 1 December.

Heats

Heat 1
The first heat took place on 6 February 2021. 3,308,000 viewers watched the heat live. A total of 7,824,951 votes were cast, using 628,624 devices (which is a record for a heat).

Heat 2
The second heat took place on 13 February 2021. 2,972,000 viewers watched the heat live. A total of 7,471,451 votes were cast, using 581,410 devices.

Heat 3
The third heat took place on 20 February 2021. 3,188,000 viewers watched the heat live. A total of 8,002,967 votes were cast, using 647,000 devices, again a record for a heat.

Heat 4
The fourth heat took place on 27 February 2021. 2,953,000 viewers watched the heat live. A total of 6,957,584 votes were cast, using 565,705 devices.

Second Chance 
The Second Chance round took place on 6 March 2021. 2,732,000 viewers watched the show live. A total of 9,159,642 votes were cast, using 632,883 devices (which are both records for the Second Chance round).

Final 
The final took place on 13 March 2021. A record-breaking 16,752,439 votes were cast, using 1,159,881 devices (which is a record for a final).

References

External links
 Melodifestivalen Official Site

2021 in Swedish music
2021 song contests
February 2021 events in Sweden
Eurovision Song Contest 2021
2021